Tacchini or Tacchino is an Italian language surname, which means "turkey". It may refer to:

Carlo Tacchini (born 1995), Italian Olympic canoeist
Gabriel Tacchino (born 1934), French pianist
Pietro Tacchini (1838–1905), Italian astronomer
Roberto Tacchini (born 1940), Italian football player
Sergio Tacchini (born 1938), Italian fashion designer

See also
8006 Tacchini, minor planet
Tacchini (crater) on the Moon

Italian-language surnames